Little Bohemia may refer to:

Bohemian (Czech) neighborhoods
Little Bohemia (Baltimore, Maryland)
Little Bohemia (Omaha, Nebraska)
Bohemian Flats, or Little Bohemia, neighborhood in Minneapolis, Minnesota

Other
West Village, or Little Bohemia, neighborhood in Manhattan, New York City
Little Bohemia Lodge, a resort and restaurant in Manitowish Waters, Wisconsin, where criminal John Dillinger was in a gunfight with federal agents